The Seralago Hotel & Suites Main Gate East is a 3-star family resort located on Irlo Bronson Highway in Kissimmee, Florida.

History
The hotel opened in March 1973 with 228 rooms in four detached buildings. For the first 32 years of its existence, the hotel was a franchise hotel of Holiday Inn.

One of the original owners of the hotel was Henri Landwirth, founder of the Give Kids The World Village, a nonprofit resort where terminally ill children would enjoy a week-long vacation with their families for no charge. Another owner of the hotel was the astronaut John Glenn, later a United States senator. Massive expansions of the resort took place in 1975, 1979, and 1989 with the opening of 445 additional rooms. This hotel pioneered the concept of "kids' suites;" suites with child-friendly themes where children have gaming consoles and their own private area for relaxation. Each kid suite can accommodate up to five people (two parents/adult guardians and three children). 

On January 1, 2005, the employees jointly took over ownership of the hotel from the Holiday Inn corporation and became an independent hotel. The current owner of the resort property is Seralago Investments LLC.

References

External links
 Seralago Hotel & Suites

Hotels established in 1973
Hotels in Greater Orlando
Buildings and structures in Kissimmee, Florida
Resorts in Florida
1973 establishments in Florida